Tom Epperson is an American author and screenwriter, known for his collaborations with Billy Bob Thornton.

Filmography

Novels
The Kind One (2008)
Sailor (2012)

External links

Official Website

American male screenwriters
Year of birth missing (living people)
Living people